The Lioré et Olivier Leo H-15 was a French twelve-seat civil flying boat, flown in a national contest in 1926. It did not win but set two load carrying records, one a world record.

Design and development

In 1926 the French government offered large prizes in a contest to produce new, multi-engined commercial seaplanes.  Compared with similar landplane competitions, few manufacturers offered a candidate; at the trials, held in July and August only the Lioré et Olivier LeO H-15 and the SPCA Météore 63 took part.

The LeO H-15 was a three-engined biplane with high aspect ratio, thin section wings of unequal span. The shorter span lower wing, with slight dihedral, was built into the hull and the upper wing was mounted on it without stagger or dihedral. The interplane struts were in parallel pairs, two outward leaning and two vertical outboard, and an interconnected central complex which both braced the wings and mounted two of its three  Gnome & Rhône 9Ab nine cylinder radial engines close inboard between the wings. The other was mounted on the upper wing over the hull.

Its hull had two steps, one under the wing trailing edge and the second further aft. The underside had a rounded, rather than V, section and was wider than its upper part. The pilot was positioned in an open cockpit just ahead of the leading edge of the wing and a "luxurious" passenger cabin, accommodating twelve, was accessed via a hatch in the nose. On each side a stabilizing float was mounted below the lower wing on extensions of the outer interplane struts, strengthened with another, inward pair.

The LeO H-15's fin was part of the hull and was roughly triangular in profile. It carried a vertical-edged, balanced rudder which extended to the lower fuselage.  A rectangular plan tailplane was mounted on the fin a little way above the fuselage, braced on each side with a parallel pair of struts to the lower fuselage and wires from the upper fin; like the rudder, the elevators were balanced.

Operational history

The LeO H-15 first flew on 10 June 1926, less than six weeks before the start of the trials on July 19 at Saint-Raphaël. It was required to achieve its Certificate of Airworthiness two days before the trials to take part. Its trials pilot was Lt. de Vaisseau Benoit. The Météore out-performed the LeO in the commercial flight tests and was judged safer and more comfortable for the passengers, though its take-offs took longer, it climbed more slowly and was less seaworthy. As a result, the Météore received the first prize of 100,000 francs and the LeO the 20,000 francs second prize.

Specifications

References

Flying boats
Trimotors
1920s French airliners
H-15
Biplanes